is a Japanese video game developed by Capcom. The game is a hybrid of a quiz game and a dating sim.

It was released in 1996 originally for the arcade game running on the CP System II platform, and was then released for the PlayStation and Sega Saturn systems in 1997.

Gameplay 
The game combines elements of a quiz game and a dating sim. Answering questions in the quiz allows the player to move through squares. Correct answers increases the love of the female characters and advances the plot.

A quiz game that answers quizzes that are given questions as you move through the squares. The correct answer to the quiz increases the love and confidence of the girl, and the story unfolds.

The game was originally an arcade title, and when ported to home console, two new routes were added. The two new scenarios were for Pixy and Lindt.

Plot 
The goal of the game is to seal the devil, and that is achieved by restoring the seven crystals assimilated into seven girls.

Characters
In the arcade version, the seven heroines and some of the other characters were named after candy companies that sponsored the game. When Quiz Nanairo Dreams was ported to home consoles, the characters were renamed. The names from the arcade version are given first, followed by their names in the console versions.

/
Voiced by Yuri Shiratori in the arcade version and Maria Kawamura in the console versions.

/
Voiced by Michiko Neya in the arcade version and the Kae Araki in the console versions.

/
Voiced by Masayo Kurata.

/
Voiced by Michiko Neya.
A seemingly ordinary 16-year-old girl who is actually a member of an international Earth Defense Force.

/
Voiced by Yuri Amano.

/
Voiced by Michiko Neya in the arcade version and Sachiko Sugawara in the console versions.

/
Voiced by Masayo Kurata in the arcade version and Miho Yamada in the console versions.

Voiced by Yuri Shiratori.

/
Voiced by Michiko Neya.

/
Voiced by Tomomichi Nishimura.

Release 
The game was released for arcades on September 20, 1996. It was ported to the Sega Saturn and Sony PlayStation home consoles and was released on June 27, 1997.

The game was added to the PlayStation Network Game Archives on July 27, 2011 in Japan.

Reception 
In Japan, Game Machine listed Quiz Nanairo Dreams on their October 15, 1996 issue as being the most-successful arcade game of the month, outperforming titles such as Dancing Eyes and Street Fighter Zero 2 Alpha. Upon release, Famitsu gave the PlayStation and Sega Saturn version of the game 28 out of 40.

Appearances in other games
Saki Omokane appears as a helper character in the Capcom fighting  game Marvel vs. Capcom: Clash of Super Heroes and a playable character in Tatsunoko vs. Capcom: Ultimate All Stars. Her main weapon is her machine gun, though this makes her physical moveset limited. Her ending has her having tea with the rest of the female characters in Tatsunoko Vs. Capcom: Cross Generation of Heroes (Roll, Jun the Swan, Morrigan, Doronjo, and Chun-Li). Saki starts explaining about her world and its mechanics, while the rest of the girls remain clueless about what she's talking about. In Ultimate All Stars, she helps save the twisting dimensions and soon finds that the reason she fights is to protect the friends she made. She then prepares to protect her city from a rampaging Hauzer. She is voiced by Yoko Honna. While she does not appear in Ultimate Marvel vs Capcom 3, one of Jill Valentine's alternate colors is based on Saki.
Saki also appears as Capcom character card C119 in the Neo Geo Pocket Color game SNK vs. Capcom: Card Fighters Clash. She comes with a special ability called "Stand-By", which is triggered once she enters the ring (field of play) and allows the player to pick one card from his deck and shuffle the rest, while placing that card on top of the deck to be drawn on the next round.  Another character, Linz, is depicted on Action card A42, called "Pester", which allows the player to put three of the opponent's pile cards among his/her discarded (out of play) cards.

References

External links
Official site for the console version (Waybacked) 

1996 video games
Arcade video games
Capcom games
CP System II games
Japan-exclusive video games
Quiz video games
PlayStation (console) games
Sega Saturn games
Video games developed in Japan